Pindwara is a municipality and tehsil located, nearby Sirohi city in Sirohi District in the Indian state of Rajasthan. Pindwara is one of main financial city of Sirohi district after Abu Road. As of 2011, the population of Pindwara is 24,487. The city used to be a major area of marble and stone carving in India by long time. It is common belief that if there is any construction of temple work all over the world, it could not complete without involvement of Pindwara artisan. This is proved by this fact that marble carvings of major temples of India like Akshardham temple network, Shri Ram temple Ayodhya are being carried out in the city.

Nearest airports are Udaipur and Ahmedabad. It is connected by RSRTC and GSRTC operated buses to all parts of Rajasthan, and Indian cities of Ahmedabad, New Delhi And Mumbai. It also have railway connectivity with Chennai, Banglore, Puri, Hyderabad, Mysuru, Agra, Haridwar, Gwalior, Kolkata, Mumbai, etc.

Pindwara region

Geography 
The city is situated in the lap of the Aravallis and is known for the high mountain ranges of the Aravallis.

History 
The history of this city is studied from the history of Sirohi. The region falls in the Sirohi kingdom and was ruled in the 14th century by Rao Devraj who belongs to the "Chouhan clan" of the Rajputana clan. At that time Pindwara was known as Pindaravak. After that Pindwara village started living as Dabi Rajput till 1630. He was a courageous and brave Kshatriya. At that time Pindwara village was not settled but was a tribal area. Then, Sirohi Maharao invited Pindwara Dabi Rajput to Sirohi and made him a special officer (officer) "treasury post". After 1650, Pindwara became under Mewar (Sisodia Rajput), Talab (Pond), Pindwara Vav (Badi Bav) were built during the time of Rana Amar Singh till 1670. After that, other Rajput clan families also started living in Pindwara, which have their own history.

Presently there are families of different Rajput community living in Pindwara which are as follows.

The Dabi family came from Khedgad.

Inda Pratihar family came from Mandore.

Kabawat Panwar family who came from Ramsin.

The Rathod family came from Marwar.

balecha family

They have their own proud history.

There is also a very ancient history of Jain community in Pindwara, who have been local residents and Bhamashahs of Pindwara since historical times.
In the historical times, the evidence of Jain religious guru and the mythological name of Pindwara, Pindaravak is also mentioned in Jain texts.

Demographics
According to the 2011 Census of India, Pindwara had a population of 24,487. Males constituted 52.40% of the population and females 47.60%. Pindwara had an average literacy rate of 75.98%, higher than the state average of 66.11%. 88.86% of the males and 61.84% of females were literate. 13.93% of the population is under 6 years of age. Pindwara was the most populous tehsil in Sirohi district with a population of 2,61,789 and controlling over 107 villages. The religious population of Pindwara was 88.56% Hindu, 7.55% Muslim, 0.08% Sikhs, 3.68% Jain, 0.05% Christians, and 0.03% did not answer.

 Source:

Climate
Pindwara is influenced by the local steppe climate.

References

Cities and towns in Sirohi district